Nansen is a children's biography of Fridtjof Nansen, the Norwegian polar explorer, written by Anna Gertrude Hall and illustrated by Boris Artzybasheff. First published in 1940, it was a Newbery Honor recipient in 1941.

References

1940 children's books
Children's history books
American children's books
Newbery Honor-winning works
Viking Press books